Alexander Francis Neustaedter (born March 29, 1998) is an American actor. He is best known for playing Bram Bowman in Colony.

Career
In 2009, Neustaedter debuted in the film Albino Farm, playing Samuel. In 2010, he starred as Caleb Johnson in Last Breath. In the following years, he participated in several short films, including Deerhunter (2009), as a prisoner; Charlie (2012), as Kevin; Frame of Mind (2013), as Keith Arbor; and Let Go (2015), as Jacob Elliot. In 2016, Neustaedter joined the main cast of USA Network's TV series Colony as Bram Bowman. He also stars in the film Shovel Buddies, which had its world premiere at South by Southwest on March 14, 2016. In 2018, he starred as the main character, Miles Hill, in A.X.L.

Filmography

References

External links

American male film actors
21st-century American male actors
People from Johnson County, Kansas
American male television actors
Living people
1998 births
Male actors from Kansas City, Kansas
American male child actors